Gudur–Katpadi branch line connects Gudur of Andhra Pradesh town with Katpadi of Tamil Nadu City. This entire line is under the jurisdiction of Guntakal railway division. It is an electrified railway section

Importance 

This line passes through pilgrim towns of Srikalahasti, Tirupati and also passes through the District Headquarters, Chittoor of Andhra Pradesh State.

References 

 

Guntakal railway division
Rail transport in Tamil Nadu
5 ft 6 in gauge railways in India